Victorio Ocaño (born 9 June 1954) is an Argentine former footballer. He played in five matches for the Argentina national football team from 1975 to 1980. He was also part of Argentina's squad for the 1979 Copa América tournament.

References

External links
 

1954 births
Living people
Argentine footballers
Argentina international footballers
Association football defenders
Footballers from Córdoba, Argentina